The  Ministry of Industry   is the Iraq government agency responsible for the industrial development of Iraq.

External links
Iraq Ministry of Industry official website

Industry
Economy of Iraq
Iraq